Sibyllonautilus is an extinct genus of nautiloids from the Middle and Late Triassic. It is one of the last of the Tainoceratidae, a family of nautilids whose range begins much earlier in the Early Carboniferous (Mississippian).

References

 Sibyllonautilus,  Paleobiology db 4/28/14
 Bernhard Kummel, 1964.  Nautiloidea -Nautilida; Treatise on Invertebrate Paleontology, Part K. Geological Society of America and University of Kansas Press.

Prehistoric nautiloid genera
Middle Triassic first appearances
Late Triassic extinctions